The 2020–21 season is the Saif SC's 5th season since its establishment in 2016 and their 4th consecutive season in the Bangladesh Premier League after promoting in 2017.

On 16 March 2020, All sorts of sports activities in Bangladesh were postponed until 31 March as a precaution to combat the spread of coronavirus in the country, according to a press release issued by the Ministry of Youth and Sports. So beginning of this season was delayed.

Season review

Pre-season
Before beginning of the season, Saif Sporting Club was looking forward to replace their head coach Drago Mamic & renew contract with team captain Jamal Bhuyan. Saif was also interested to replace foreign players & some local youths. Jahongir Ergashev and Murolimzhon Akhmedov already left the club to join FK Khujand and FC Neftchi respectively. On 24 September, it was announced that Emery Bayisenge joining Rwandan club AS Kigali on a one-year loan deal from Saif SC. As of a Rwandan news publisher, the transfer fee was 12 millions Rwandan franc.

On 29 October, managing director Nasiruddin Chowdhury confirmed that they’re bringing belgian coach Paul Put to replace Mamic. 

On 31 October, Saif SC sent names of three players they want to let go for the 2020-21 season to BFF. The players were forward Mehebub Hasan Nayan & Kafsut Taius along with defender Nazmul Hossain Akondo.

On 11 November, the club officially announced the signing of Emmanuel Ariwachukwu, John Okoli, Kenneth Ikechukwu and Sirozhiddin Rakhmatullaev. 

On 29 November, Saif SC played a pre-season friendly with Bangladesh Police FC. The match was won by 2-0 as Kenneth & John found the net.

Players
Saif Sporting Club Limited squad for 2020–21 season.

Transfers

In

Out

Loans out

Note :
Italic names refer to the players who have transferred from the youth team.

Pre-season and friendlies

Competitions

Overview

Federation Cup

Group stage

Group B

Knockout phase

Premier League

League table

Results summary

Results by round

Matches

Statistics

Goals

References

Saif SC
Football clubs in Bangladesh
2020 in Bangladeshi football
2021 in Bangladeshi football